Albertia naidis is a species of rotifer belonging to the family Dicranophoridae.

Synonym:
 Albertia bernardi Hlava, 1904

References

Ploima